Kjelsås Fotball is the association football section of the sports club Kjelsås IL, based in the Kjelsås/Grefsen area of Oslo, Norway. The club was founded in 1913. It currently plays in the 2. divisjon, having been relegated from the 1. divisjon in 2001.

Kjelsås played play-off against Kongsvinger to earn promotion to Tippeligaen in 1998, but lost 7–2 on aggregate. On 11 May 2011, Kjelsås eliminated the top-tier team Vålerenga in the second round of the 2011 Norwegian Cup.

Kjelsås Fotball had 1370 players (of these about 460 female) registered in 2019, divided in 55 teams.

Recent history

{|class="wikitable"
|-bgcolor="#efefef"
! Season
! 
! Pos.
! Pl.
! W
! D
! L
! GS
! GA
! P
!Cup
!Notes
|-
|1988
|2. divisjon
|align=right|4
|align=right|22||align=right|9||align=right|6||align=right|7
|align=right|49||align=right|40||align=right|33
||Third round
|
|-
|1989
|2. divisjon
|align=right|8
|align=right|22||align=right|8||align=right|2||align=right|12
|align=right|33||align=right|51||align=right|26
||First round
|
|-
|1990
|2. divisjon
|align=right|2
|align=right|22||align=right|12||align=right|5||align=right|5
|align=right|40||align=right|21||align=right|41
||Second round
|
|-
|1991
|2. divisjon
|align=right|3
|align=right|22||align=right|10||align=right|7||align=right|5
|align=right|40||align=right|29||align=right|37
||Second round
|
|-
|1992
|2. divisjon
|align=right|2
|align=right|22||align=right|13||align=right|5||align=right|4
|align=right|48||align=right|26||align=right|44
||Second round
|
|-
|1993
|2. divisjon
|align=right|8
|align=right|22||align=right|8||align=right|3||align=right|11
|align=right|38||align=right|38||align=right|27
||Second round
|
|-
|1994
|2. divisjon
|align=right|9
|align=right|22||align=right|6||align=right|8||align=right|8
|align=right|20||align=right|34||align=right|26
||First round
|
|-
|1995
|2. divisjon
|align=right|3
|align=right|22||align=right|12||align=right|4||align=right|6
|align=right|42||align=right|19||align=right|40
||Third round
|
|-
|1996
|2. divisjon
|align=right|6
|align=right|22||align=right|9||align=right|3||align=right|10
|align=right|34||align=right|34||align=right|30
||Second round
|
|-
|1997
|2. divisjon
|align=right bgcolor=#DDFFDD| 1
|align=right|22||align=right|13||align=right|6||align=right|3
|align=right|46||align=right|20||align=right|45
||First round
||Promoted
|-
|1998
|1. divisjon
|align=right|3
|align=right|26||align=right|11||align=right|8||align=right|7
|align=right|43||align=right|34||align=right|41
||Third round
||Lost playoffs for promotion
|-
|1999
|1. divisjon
|align=right|6
|align=right|26||align=right|11||align=right|8||align=right|7
|align=right|33||align=right|28||align=right|41
||4th round
|
|-
|2000
|1. divisjon
|align=right|8
|align=right|26||align=right|8||align=right|7||align=right|11
|align=right|30||align=right|40||align=right|31
||Second round
|
|-
|2001
|1. divisjon
|align=right bgcolor="#FFCCCC"| 15
|align=right|30||align=right|6||align=right|6||align=right|18
|align=right|26||align=right|50||align=right|24
||Second round
||Relegated
|-
|2002
|2. divisjon
|align=right|6
|align=right|26||align=right|13||align=right|5||align=right|8
|align=right|46||align=right|30||align=right|44
||Second round
|
|-
|2003
|2. divisjon
|align=right|7
|align=right|26||align=right|8||align=right|9||align=right|9
|align=right|32||align=right|36||align=right|33
||First round
|
|-
|2004
|2. divisjon
|align=right|9
|align=right|26||align=right|9||align=right|7||align=right|10
|align=right|38||align=right|39||align=right|34
||First round
|
|-
|2005
|2. divisjon
|align=right|9
|align=right|26||align=right|10||align=right|4||align=right|12
|align=right|41||align=right|53||align=right|34
||Second round
|
|-
|2006
|2. divisjon
|align=right|10
|align=right|26||align=right|10||align=right|3||align=right|13
|align=right|36||align=right|55||align=right|33
||Second round
|
|-
|2007
|2. divisjon
|align=right |4
|align=right|26||align=right|10||align=right|6||align=right|10
|align=right|61||align=right|57||align=right|36
||First round
|
|-
|2008 
|2. divisjon
|align=right |10
|align=right|26||align=right|9||align=right|6||align=right|11
|align=right|32||align=right|41||align=right|33
||First round
|
|-
|2009
|2. divisjon
|align=right|9
|align=right|26||align=right|9||align=right|5||align=right|12
|align=right|38||align=right|47||align=right|32
||Second round
|
|-
|2010
|2. divisjon
|align=right |3
|align=right|26||align=right|14||align=right|5||align=right|7
|align=right|58||align=right|47||align=right|47
||Second round
|
|-
|2011 
|2. divisjon
|align=right |7
|align=right|26||align=right|11||align=right|7||align=right|8
|align=right|61||align=right|42||align=right|40
||Third round
|
|-
|2012 
|2. divisjon
|align=right |5
|align=right|26||align=right|14||align=right|2||align=right|10
|align=right|58||align=right|48||align=right|44
||Second round
|
|-
|2013
|2. divisjon
|align=right |6
|align=right|26||align=right|12||align=right|4||align=right|10
|align=right|39||align=right|37||align=right|40
||Second round
|
|-
|2014 
|2. divisjon
|align=right |2
|align=right|26||align=right|18||align=right|4||align=right|4
|align=right|74||align=right|28||align=right|58
||First round
|
|-
|2015 
|2. divisjon
|align=right |5
|align=right|26||align=right|13||align=right|7||align=right|6
|align=right|62||align=right|33||align=right|46
||Second round
|
|-
|2016 
|2. divisjon
|align=right |6
|align=right|26||align=right|11||align=right|8||align=right|7
|align=right|38||align=right|34||align=right|41
||Second round
|
|-
|2017
|2. divisjon
|align=right |8
|align=right|26||align=right|9||align=right|7||align=right|10
|align=right|34||align=right|40||align=right|34
||Third round
|
|-
|2018
|2. divisjon
|align=right |7
|align=right|26||align=right|9||align=right|8||align=right|9
|align=right|38||align=right|36||align=right|35
||Second round
|
|-
|2019 
|2. divisjon
|align=right |3
|align=right|26||align=right|13||align=right|8||align=right|5
|align=right|50||align=right|30||align=right|47
||Second round
|
|-
|2020
|2. divisjon
|align=right |11
|align=right|13||align=right|3||align=right|5||align=right|5
|align=right|21||align=right|21||align=right|14
||Cancelled
|
|-
|2021
|2. divisjon
|align=right |9
|align=right|26||align=right|8||align=right|9||align=right|9
|align=right|43||align=right|44||align=right|33
||Second round
|
|-
|2022
|2. divisjon
|align=right |4
|align=right|26||align=right|12||align=right|6||align=right|8
|align=right|45||align=right|20||align=right|42
||Third round
|
|}
Source:

Club records
Record attendance
 3,295 vs Kongsvinger IL, 1998 play-off match for Tippeligaen.
Club achievements
League
 Highest league finish - 3rd place 1. divisjon, 1998.
 Second Division winners: 1997.
 Second Division runner-up: 1982, 1990, 1992, 2014.
 Third Division winners: 1969, 1977, 1978, 1980.
Norwegian cup
4th round twice: 1987 (lost 5–3 vs FK Bodø-Glimt), 1994 (lost 3–2 vs Molde FK).
Most games (since 1977) 
 1. Dag Halvorsen (327 games)
 2. Rune Jarl (326 games)
 3. Arne Jensen (240 games)
Most goals (since 1995) 
 1. Dag Halvorsen (96 goals)
 2. Simen Stamsø Møller (84 goals)
 3. Martin Hansen (71 goals)

References

External links
Official website
Fan site

Football clubs in Oslo
1913 establishments in Norway
Association football clubs established in 1913